George Bell & Sons was a book publishing house located in London, United Kingdom, from 1839 to 1986.

History 

George Bell & Sons was founded by George Bell as an educational bookseller, with the intention of selling the output of London university presses; but became best known as an independent publisher of classics and children's books.

One of Bell's first investments in publishing was a series of Railway Companions; that is, booklets of timetables and tourist guides. Within a year Bell's publishing business had outstripped his retail business, and he elected to move from his original offices into Fleet Street. There G. Bell & Sons branched into the publication of books on art, architecture, and archaeology, in addition to the classics for which the company was already known. Bell's reputation was only improved by his association with Henry Cole.

In the mid-1850s, Bell expanded again, printing the children's books of Margaret Gatty (Parables from Nature) and Juliana Horatia Ewing (the Nursery Magazine). Around the same time, in 1854, he acquired J. & J. J. Deighton, a bookseller's outfit in Cambridge, which thereupon changed its name to Deighton, Bell, & Company. Then, in 1856, Bell brought on board as a partner Frederick Daldy, and renamed the company Bell & Daldy.

With Daldy, Bell began to print more poetry collections, including the Aldine Edition of British Poets and the works of Andrew Lang and Robert Bridges. To the firm's educational output was added Webster's Dictionary, after Bell acquired the British rights to Webster's work. Then, Bell & Daldy took over the libraries of Henry George Bohn, a Covent Garden publisher, and moved their operation to Bohn's former location. With such an extensive library available for publication, Bell's original retail location in Fleet Street was no longer necessary; the firm moved out of Fleet Street for good in 1867.

Daldy left the firm (renamed George Bell & Sons) in 1873, to join the firm of Virtue, Spalding, & Daldy. In 1888, Bell left the piloting of the firm to his sons, Edward and Ernest, but maintained a healthy interest in its day-to-day operation until his death in 1890. In 1910 the firm became a limited liability company, George Bell & Sons, Ltd.

In 1926 Edward Bell died; his son Arthur took his place on the board and became chairman himself in 1936. Other members of the board gradually took over the operation of the firm, until Arthur's death in 1968. In 1977, Robin Philip Hyman became the managing director of Bell & Hyman, Ltd., and the firm moved to Queen Elizabeth Street, London, where it remained until going out of business. In 1986, Bell & Hyman Ltd merged with George Allen & Unwin to form Unwin Hyman. Unwin Hyman was acquired by HarperCollins in 1990.

George Bell's brother John also worked for the Bell firm; John managed the Chiswick Press until his death in 1885.

Addresses
1839: 1 Bouverie Street
1840: 186 Fleet Street
1854: Acquired Deighton's offices at Green Street and Trinity Street, Cambridge
1864: Acquired 4 York Street, Covent Garden. This location had quite a pedigree: The previous occupant of these houses was the publishing company of Henry George Bohn; before that they had belonged to the bookseller J. H. Bohte, who specialized in classics; and before that (though not immediately before) they had been the home of Thomas de Quincey.
1867: Moved out of Fleet Street
1903: York House, 6 Portugal Street, WC2 designed for George Bell & Sons by Horace Field
1977: Denmark House, Queen Elizabeth Street

Selected publications 
 Frederick Henry Ambrose Scrivener (1861) A Plain Introduction to the Criticism of the New Testament
 W. H. Besant (1900) Elementary Hydrostatics
 Irene Clyde (1909) Beatrice the Sixteenth
 Ralph Waldo Trine (1911) In Tune With The Infinite
 Duncan Sommerville (1914) The Elements of Non-Euclidean Geometry
 David Wooster - Alpine Plants

Book series 
 The Aldine Edition of the British Poets
 Alpha Classics
 Bell's Annotated English Classics 
 Bell's Cathedral Series
 Bell's English Classics
 Bell's Handbooks to Continental Churches
 Bell's Indian & Colonial Library
 Bibliotheca Classica
 Bohn's Libraries 
 Bohn's Popular Library
 Classics of Scientific Method 
 Great Masters in Painting and Sculpture
 The Great Public Schools
 Life and Light Books
 The Queen's Treasures Series. 
 York Library

References

Further reading
 Edward Bell, George Bell, Publisher: A Brief Memoir, London: Printed for private circulation by the Chiswick Press, 1924.
 Marjory Long, "George Bell and Sons", in: Patricia J. Anderson and Jonathan Rose, eds., Dictionary of Literary Biography, Vol. 106: British Literary Publishing Houses, 1820-1880, Detroit and London: Gale, 1991, pp. 22-31.

External links
Archive of George Bell & Sons Ltd in the collection of the University of Reading

Book publishing companies based in London
Publishing companies disestablished in 1986
Children's book publishers
Companies based in the London Borough of Southwark
Companies based in Cambridge
Defunct companies of the United Kingdom
Educational book publishing companies
Publishing companies established in 1839